The Armenian National Institute (ANI) is a Washington, D.C.-based organization dedicated to the research of Armenian genocide. It was founded in 1997 by the Armenian Assembly of America to bring more awareness to the Armenian genocide.  The abbreviation of the Institute, ANI, is the name of the medieval capital of Armenia.

The ANI works to educate the public about the Armenian Genocide through a variety of means, including the creation and dissemination of educational materials, the organization of exhibitions and events, and the publication of research and analysis on the topic. The ANI has also played a key role in advocating for the recognition of the Armenian Genocide by governments around the world.

In addition to its work on the Armenian Genocide, the ANI is also involved in the documentation and study of other instances of genocide, including the Holocaust, the Cambodian Genocide, and the Rwandan Genocide. The organization's aim is to use these studies to promote a better understanding of the nature of genocide and to work towards its prevention in the future.

Overall, the Armenian National Institute is a significant organization that has played an important role in the study and documentation of the Armenian Genocide, as well as in broader efforts to raise awareness about the issue of genocide around the world.

ANI supports the publication of academic works and informational materials to promote better awareness of genocide.

References

External links
Official site

1997 establishments in Washington, D.C.
Armenian genocide commemoration
Armenian studies
Research institutes established in 1997
Research institutes in Washington, D.C.

Non-profit organizations based in Washington, D.C.
501(c)(3) organizations